Carmelo Domênico Recchia, O. Cist, (14 December 1921 – 26 August 2015) was an Italian prelate of the Roman Catholic Church. Recchia was born in Sora and ordained a priest on 4 August 1946 from the religious order of Order of Cistercians. Recchia was confirmed Abbot of the Territorial abbey of Claraval on 7 December 1976. Recchia retired as abbot of Claraval on 24 March 1999.

See also
Order of Cistercians
Territorial abbey
Ist. del Prado

External links
Catholic-Hierarchy

1921 births
2015 deaths
20th-century Italian Roman Catholic priests
Italian abbots